The Mosque of Kaloutsiani (rendered in Greek as ) is a historical Ottoman mosque in the town of  Ioannina, Epirus, in northwestern Greece. It was built in 1740, and since 2005 it been the subject of restoration campaigns and works. It is one of several surviving mosques in Ioannina, others being the Veli Pasha Mosque, the Fethiye Mosque and the Aslan Pasha Mosque.

Name 
In 1611, Ioannina and the surrounding region experienced turmoil as a failed Greek revolt led by Dionysius Skylosophos, the former Metropolitan of Larissa, broke out. The movement however gathered little support and was harshly suppressed by the Ottoman Empire, who drove the defeated Greek and Albanian families out of the fortress of Ioannina. The expelled families settled in the area where the current mosque stands now; at the time, it was where the seraglio of the Ottoman dignitary Osman Pasha stood. The district, epicenter of the peasant uprising and southwestern gateway to the city, was dubbed "Bloody Fountain" by the populace, a name that is also mentioned by the Ottoman traveler Evliya Çelebi in the middle of the seventeenth century, when he visited Ioannina.

Another hypothesis for the etymology of the toponym is that is derives from Mehmet Pasha II, the son of Haci Mehmed Pasha. He was nicknamed “the good pasha” (which in Greek is), and had a fountain erected near the mosque, an act that would give the district the term "good fountain".

The name of the mosque was also rendered as  mosque in the Greek language, but it is also known as Haci Mehmed Pasha mosque or even Ahmed Pasha mosque.

History 
According to a dedicatory inscription that was found in the building, the Kaloutsiani Mosque was commissioned in 1740 by Haci Mehmed Pasha, former governor of Ioannina, on the site of a previous, small wooden mosque for daily prayer which was probably dated to around the end of the fifteenth century. This original mosque was probably burnt to the ground during the 1611 revolt, and needed to be replaced. During its history, the building of Haci Mehmed Pasha was partially damaged by earthquakes and renovated each time.

Ioannina and the wider region of Epirus became part of modern Greece following the defeat of the Ottoman Empire in the First Balkan War, which cost the Ottomans the majority of their European holdings. After 1913 the mosque was became part of the National Bank of Greece's list of tradable goods and it was temporarily used as an intercity bus station. Classified in 1925, the place was sold in 1932 to private individuals who added numerous stalls inside the large portico. Among the several shops that were built in over the decades was the popular coffeehouse "The Mosque". The roof of the minaret was destroyed sometime between 1920 and 1944, probably during the Italian bombardments in 1940 during the Greco-Italian War.

Since 2005, the building belongs to the Greek Ministry of Culture and Sports, which aims for the restoration of both the mosque and the Tzavelas Square. A plan is currently being implemented, seeking to restoring Kaloutsiani Mosque to its original appearance.

Architecture 
The mosque has an area of 231 square meters. Kaloutsiani Mosque has a square prayer room, with a side of 11.50 metres on the outside. The structure is made up of two slightly projecting levels separated by a cornice, the whole being surmounted by a dome whose octagonal dome that rests on top of four squinches. A colonnaded portico, which has been blocked out ever since the ground floor has been used as shops, is found in the north and east facades. The open space between the ten columns once sported wooden crosspieces intended to support the structure in case an earthquake hit the town.

Initially, the south and west façades of the mosque had each two rows of two windows, however the lower openings were replaced by doors in the twentieth century. The dome and the roof of the portico are covered with slates. Four angular flying buttresses connect the drum to the square base of the structure.

Despite its recent usage as a shopping area, the building retains a rich painted decoration of Arabic inscriptions on the dome interior, a wooden and green plaster mihrab, part of the pyramid-shaped minbar and a 20.36 metres tall minaret (whose roof is not preserved) in its northwest corner. Inside, on the north side, there is also an elevated gallery of carved wood.

See also 

 Islam in Greece
 Ottoman Greece
 List of mosques in Greece
 List of former mosques in Greece

References

Bibliography 
 
 
 
 
 
 
 

Ottoman mosques in Greece
Former mosques in Greece
Mosque buildings with domes
Ottoman architecture in Ioannina
18th-century architecture in Greece
Mosques completed in the 1740s